is a passenger railway station located in the city of Yonago, Tottori Prefecture, Japan. It is operated by the West Japan Railway Company (JR West).

Lines

Station layout
The station consists of three ground level island platforms serving six tracks. Platform 1 faces the station building, and Platform 0, which is dedicated to the Sakai Line, is located in a cutout on the east side of Platform 1. Platforms 2 and 3 and 4 and 5 are connected by footbridge. In the past, there was a middle track without a platform between platform 1 and platform 2, which was used by freight trains, as well as for deadheaded trains bound for the Goto General Depot. The station has a Midori no Madoguchi staffed ticket office.

Platforms

History
Yonago Station opened on November 1, 1902.

Passenger statistics
In fiscal 2018, the station was used by an average of 3,699 passengers daily.

Surrounding area
Yonago City Hall
Yonago City Museum of Art
Yonago City Library
Yonago Chamber of Commerce.
Tottori University Medical School

See also
 List of railway stations in Japan

References

External links 

 Yonago Station (JR West) 

Stations of West Japan Railway Company
Railway stations in Japan opened in 1902
Railway stations in Tottori Prefecture
Sanin Main Line
Yonago, Tottori